The Hrušky oil field is an oil field located in Hrušky, Vyškov District, South Moravian Region. It was discovered in 1990 and developed by Unipetrol. It began production in 1992 and  produces oil.

See also

 Energy in the Czech Republic

References

Oil fields in the Czech Republic
Vyškov District